Jacques Brel 67 is Jacques Brel's tenth studio album. Originally released in 1967 by Barclay (B 8024), the album was reissued on 23 September 2003 under the title Jacques Brel 67 as part of the 16-CD box set Boîte à Bonbons by Barclay (980 817-3).

Track listing 

 Tracks 1–10 constituted the original 1967 album. 
 Track 11 was added to the album when it was reissued as part of the 16-CD box set Boîte à Bonbons.

Personnel 

François Rauber – orchestra conductor, arranger
 Gerhardt Lehner – recording engineer & audio mixing (uncredited)
Alain Marouani, Hubert Grooteclaes - photography

References 

Jacques Brel albums
1967 albums
French-language albums
Barclay (record label) albums
Universal Records albums
Albums conducted by François Rauber